Lightfoot's moss frog or the Cape Peninsula moss frog (Arthroleptella lightfooti) is a species of frog in the family Pyxicephalidae.
It is endemic to South Africa.
Its natural habitats are temperate forest, Mediterranean-type shrubby vegetation, and rivers.
It is threatened by habitat loss.

References

Arthroleptella
Amphibians of South Africa
Amphibians described in 1910
Taxonomy articles created by Polbot